Senator Nixon may refer to:

Members of the United States Senate
George S. Nixon (1860–1912), U.S. Senator from Nevada from 1905 to 1912
Richard Nixon (1913–1994), U.S. Senator from California from 1950 to 1953

United States state senate members
Drew Nixon (born 1959), Texas State Senate
Jay Nixon (born 1956), Missouri State Senate
Richard Nixon (Montana politician) (1901–1975), Montana State Senate